Christos Dimitropoulos (born 1913, date of death unknown) was a Greek athlete. He competed in the men's hammer throw at the 1936 Summer Olympics.

References

External links
 

1913 births
Year of death missing
Athletes (track and field) at the 1936 Summer Olympics
Greek male hammer throwers
Olympic athletes of Greece
Sportspeople from Corinth